Minuscule 616 (in the Gregory-Aland numbering), α 503 (von Soden), is a Greek minuscule manuscript of the New Testament, on paper. It is dated by a colophon to the 1434. The manuscript has complex contents. Tischendorf labelled it by 139a, 174p, and 156r.

Description 

The codex contains the text of the New Testament except Gospels on 164 paper leaves (size ). The text is written in two columns per page, 31 lines per page.

The order of books: Acts of the Apostles, Catholic epistles, Pauline epistles, and Book of Revelation. Hebrews is placed after Epistle to Philemon.

Text 

The Greek text of the codex is a representative of the Byzantine text-type. Aland placed it in Category V.

History 

According to the colophon it was written on March 20, 1434, by Athanasius, for the wish of one Joannes.

The manuscript was bought in Padua in 1603 and came to Milan.

The manuscript was added to the list of New Testament manuscripts by Johann Martin Augustin Scholz. Gregory saw the manuscript in 1886. The text of the Apocalypse was collated by Herman C. Hoskier.

Formerly it was labelled by 139a, 174p, and 156r. In 1908 Gregory gave the number 616 to it.

The manuscript currently is housed at the Biblioteca Ambrosiana (H. 104 sup.), at Milan.

See also 

 List of New Testament minuscules
 Biblical manuscript
 Textual criticism

References

Further reading 

 Herman C. Hoskier, Concerning the Text of the Apocalypse: Collation of All Existing Available Greek Documents with the Standard Text of Stephen’s Third Edition Together with the Testimony of Versions, Commentaries and Fathers. 1 vol. (London: Bernard Quaritch, Ltd., 1929), pp. 530–534.

Greek New Testament minuscules
15th-century biblical manuscripts